George Reginald Collie (born 21 April 1941) is a Bahamian sprinter. He competed in the men's 100 metres and men's 200 metres at the 1964 Summer Olympics.

References

1941 births
Living people
Athletes (track and field) at the 1964 Summer Olympics
Bahamian male sprinters
Olympic athletes of the Bahamas
Athletes (track and field) at the 1966 British Empire and Commonwealth Games
Athletes (track and field) at the 1967 Pan American Games
Commonwealth Games competitors for the Bahamas
Sportspeople from Nassau, Bahamas
Pan American Games competitors for the Bahamas